The canton of Plouigneau is an administrative division of the Finistère department, northwestern France. Its borders were modified at the French canton reorganisation which came into effect in March 2015. Its seat is in Plouigneau.

It consists of the following communes:
 
Botsorhel
Le Cloître-Saint-Thégonnec
Garlan
Guerlesquin
Guimaëc
Lanmeur
Lannéanou
Locquirec
Plouégat-Guérand
Plouégat-Moysan
Plouezoc'h
Plougasnou
Plougonven
Plouigneau
Plourin-lès-Morlaix
Saint-Jean-du-Doigt

References

Cantons of Finistère